Thermonectus zimmermani is a species of diving beetle native to western Mexican states of Jalisco, Colima, and Morelos. However, T. marmoratus has a spotted pattern of yellow circles, T. zimmermani has an irregular, blotched pattern. T. zimmermani head has a V-shaped medial black marking that has been reduced.

References

Dytiscidae
Beetles of North America
Beetles described in 1981